In the geologic timescale, the Sinemurian is an age and stage in the Early or Lower Jurassic Epoch or Series. It spans the time between 199.3 ± 2 Ma and 190.8 ± 1.5 Ma (million years ago). The Sinemurian is preceded by the Hettangian and is followed by the Pliensbachian.

In Europe the Sinemurian age, together with the Hettangian age, saw the deposition of the lower Lias, in Great Britain known as the Blue Lias.

Stratigraphic definitions
The Sinemurian Stage was defined and introduced into scientific literature by French palaeontologist Alcide d'Orbigny in 1842. It takes its name from the French town of Semur-en-Auxois, near Dijon. The calcareous soil formed from the Jurassic limestone of the region is in part responsible for the character of the classic Sancerre wines.
 
The base of the Sinemurian Stage is at the first appearance of the ammonite genera Vermiceras and Metophioceras in the stratigraphic record.

The top of the Sinemurian (the base of the Pliensbachian) is at the first appearances of the ammonite species Bifericeras donovani and ammonite genus Apoderoceras.

The Sinemurian contains six ammonite biozones in the Tethys domain:
zone of Echioceras raricostatum
zone of Oxynoticeras oxynotum
zone of Asteroceras obtusum
zone of Caenisites turneri
zone of Arnioceras semicostatum
zone of Arietites bucklandi

References

Sources
; 2001: Global Stratotype Section and Point for base of the Sinemurian Stage (Lower Jurassic), Episodes 25(1), pp. 22–28, PDF
; 2004: A Geologic Time Scale 2004, Cambridge University Press.
; 1842: Paléontologie française. 1. Terrains oolitiques ou jurassiques, Bertrand, Paris.

See also 

 Komlosaurus carbonis

External links
GeoWhen Database - Sinemurian
Lower Jurassic timescale, at the website of the subcommission for stratigraphic information of the ICS
Stratigraphic chart of the Lower Jurassic, at the website of Norges Network of offshore records of geology and stratigraphy

 
02
Geological ages